The United Democratic Alliance (UDA) was a political alliance in Zambia formed to contest the 2006 general elections.

History
The UDA was formed on 1 March 2006 by the United Party for National Development (UPND), the United National Independence Party (UNIP) and the Forum for Democracy and Development, which between them had won 74 of the 150 elected seats in the National Assembly in the 2001 elections. Anderson Mazoka, who had finished as runner-up in the presidential elections, was the alliance's leader until his death in May 2006. He was succeeded by Hakainde Hichilema, also of the UPND.

In the 2006 elections Hichilema finished third out of the five presidential candidates with 25% of the vote. In the National Assembly elections the alliance received 23% of the vote, winning 26 seats.

The three parties contested the 2011 elections separately.

Election results

President

National Assembly

References 

Political party alliances in Zambia
Political parties established in 2006
2006 establishments in Zambia
Defunct political parties in Zambia
Political parties with year of disestablishment missing